Jean-Louis Morin may refer to:

 Jean-Louis Morin (dancer) (1953–1995), Canadian choreographer and the principal dancer for the Martha Graham Dance Company
 Jean-Louis Morin (porcelain painter) (1732–1787), French porcelain painter

See also
Jean Morin (disambiguation)